HTV (formerly an acronym of Hispanic Television) is a Latin American pay television channel that broadcasts Hispanic music videos. It is owned by Warner Bros. Discovery International and it is also available in the United States and Europe. It airs Latin music genres such as balada, salsa, merengue and other popular rhythms from that region, introduced by artists themselves as VJs.

The channel was first launched in 1996 by Claxson Interactive Group. In 2006, Turner Broadcasting System purchased Claxson's channels suit, which included regional networks such as Glitz, Infinito, I.Sat, Much Music, Retro and Space.

In 2010, Dish Network stopped carrying HTV in the United States.

External links 
 Official site

 
Warner Bros. Discovery networks
Music video networks in the United States
Spanish-language television networks in the United States
Television channels and stations established in 1995